Jan Verhaas (born 5 October 1966) is a Dutch snooker and pool referee. He was born in Maassluis, South Holland, and now lives in Brielle.

Career
After working as a process operator for Shell Chemicals, Verhaas qualified as a class 1 snooker referee in 1990. In 1989 he had been helping at tournaments at a friend's snooker club in Rotterdam, when referee Michael Clarke advised him about refereeing and encouraged him to qualify.

His first professional match as a snooker referee was in 1993 (between Tony Drago and Steve Davis). In 2003 he became the first man from outside the United Kingdom to referee the final of the World Snooker Championship, and he refereed the 2006 World Final between Peter Ebdon and Graeme Dott. Verhaas was in control of all three Masters finals which the late Paul Hunter won, and he describes them as his most memorable matches.

During his time as a snooker referee, Verhaas has occasionally been involved in  controversy. On 21 January 2007, he was the referee of the final of the Masters between Ronnie O'Sullivan and Ding Junhui, in which he ejected at least one fan from Wembley Arena for heckling the 19-year-old Chinese player. On 19 January 2012, at the Masters, Verhaas mistakenly stopped Graeme Dott in the middle of a break to adjust the score, before realising he made an error and the score was in fact correct. After apologising to Dott, the player then missed his next shot and went on to lose the frame, and the match.

Verhaas has been in charge of seven tournament matches that have contained maximum breaks. He played a notable role in Ronnie O'Sullivan's record 10th maximum break on 20 September 2010 at the World Open. After finding out that there was no special prize for completing a 147, O'Sullivan shook hands with opponent Mark King after potting the last pink. Verhaas, however, persuaded O'Sullivan to pot the last black and finish his break.

For several years he also refereed nine-ball pool tournaments organised by Matchroom Sport. This included several appearances at the Mosconi Cup and the initial Matchroom-organised 1999 World Professional Pool Championship, which was won by Efren Reyes.

He was elected as a board member of the World Professional Billiards and Snooker Association in 2016.

Major finals
 World Championship – 2003, 2006, 2008, 2011, 2013, 2017
 UK Championship – 2005, 2006, 2008, 2015
 Masters – 1999, 2001, 2002, 2004, 2007, 2009, 2010, 2019

References

External links

 Profile on World Snooker
 BBC Sport interview with Jan Verhaas

1966 births
Living people
Dutch referees and umpires
Snooker referees and officials
Pool referees and officials
Sportspeople from Maassluis